The 2021–22 Florida Gators men's basketball team represented the University of Florida during the 2021–22 NCAA Division I men's basketball season. The team was led by seventh-year head coach Mike White, and played their home games at the O'Connell Center in Gainesville, Florida as a member of the Southeastern Conference. They finished the season 20–14, 9–9 in SEC Play to finish a five-way tie for fifth place. As the No. 9 seed in the SEC tournament, they lost in the second round to Texas A&M. They received an at-large bid to the National Invitation Tournament where they defeated Iona in the first round before losing to Xavier.

On March 13, 2022, head coach Mike White left the school to take the head coaching position at Georgia. On March 18, the school named San Francisco head coach Todd Golden the team's new head coach.

Previous season 
In a season limited by the ongoing COVID-19 pandemic, the Gators finished the 2020–21 season 15–10, 9–7 in SEC play to finish in fifth place. They defeated Vanderbilt in the second round of the SEC tournament before losing to Tennessee in the quarterfinals. They received an at-large bid to the NCAA tournament as the No. 7 seed in the South region. There they defeated Virginia Tech before losing to Oral Roberts in the second round.

Offseason

Departures

Incoming transfers

2021 recruiting class

2022 recruiting class

Roster

Schedule and results

|-
!colspan=12 style=|Exhibition

|-
!colspan=12 style=|Regular season

|-
!colspan=12 style=|SEC tournament

|-
!colspan=12 style=|NIT tournament

Source

Rankings

*AP does not release post-NCAA tournament rankings.
No Coaches Poll for Week 1.

See also
2021–22 Florida Gators women's basketball team

References

Florida Gators men's basketball seasons
Florida Gators
Florida Gators men's basketball
Florida Gators men's basketball
Florida